Tan Lee Fatt is a Malaysian politician who has served as the State Assistant Minister of Finance of Sabah in the Gabungan Rakyat Sabah (GRS) administration under Chief Minister Hajiji Noor and Minister Masidi Manjun since January 2023 and Member of the Sabah State Legislative Assembly (MLA) for Likas since May 2018. He is a member and State Assistant Secretary of Sabah of the Democratic Action Party (DAP), a component party of the Pakatan Harapan (PH) coalition.

Election result

References 

21st-century Malaysian politicians
Place of birth missing (living people)
Democratic Action Party (Malaysia) politicians
Members of the Sabah State Legislative Assembly
Malaysian people of Chinese descent
Malaysian politicians of Chinese descent
Living people
Year of birth missing (living people)